Sven Olof Wilhelm "Olle" "Sheriffen" Dahlberg (4 October 1928 – 13 May 1997) was a Swedish speed skater who competed in the 1956 Winter Olympics and in the 1960 Winter Olympics.

He was born in Sollefteå and died in Sundsvall.

In 1956 he finished seventh in the 5000 metres event and eighth in the 10000 metres competition.

Four years later he finished seventh in the 10000 metres contest, 13th in the 5000 metres event, 18th in the 1500 metres competition and 30th in the 500 metres contest at the 1960 Games.

External links
 profile

1928 births
1997 deaths
Swedish male speed skaters
Olympic speed skaters of Sweden
Speed skaters at the 1956 Winter Olympics
Speed skaters at the 1960 Winter Olympics
People from Sollefteå Municipality
Sportspeople from Västernorrland County
20th-century Swedish people